Chipperfield is a hamlet in Monet Rural Municipality No. 257, Saskatchewan, Canada. The hamlet is located at the junction of Highway 752 and Range road 170 approximately 50 km south-west of the Town of Rosetown, only 170 km south-west of the City of Saskatoon.

See also
 List of communities in Saskatchewan
 Hamlets of Saskatchewan

References

Monet No. 257, Saskatchewan
Unincorporated communities in Saskatchewan
Ghost towns in Saskatchewan